Andrew Scott O'Hearne is a New Hampshire politician.

Career
O'Hearne has worked as a police officer. On November 6, 2012, O'Hearne was elected to the New Hampshire House of Representatives where he represents the Sullivan 3 district. He served in this position until 2016. O'Hearne was once again elected to this position on November 6, 2018, and assumed the office again on December 5, 2018. O'Hearne is a Democrat. O'Hearne endorsed Pete Buttigieg in the 2020 Democratic Party presidential primaries.

Personal life
O'Hearne resides in Claremont, New Hampshire.

References

Living people
People from Claremont, New Hampshire
American police officers
Democratic Party members of the New Hampshire House of Representatives
21st-century American politicians
Year of birth missing (living people)